Tang Darreh or Tang-e Darreh may refer to:
 Tang Darreh, Gilan
 Tang Darreh, Mazandaran